Guillermo Cubillos (born 14 January 1995) is a Chilean footballer that currently plays for Primera B de Chile club Barnechea as a defender.

Career

Youth career

Cubillos started his career at Primera División de Chile club O'Higgins. He progressed from the under categories club all the way to the senior team.

O'Higgins

On 1 February 2015, Cubillos debuted against Unión La Calera replacing Damián Lizio at the 90+2' on the 2-1 win at the Estadio El Teniente.

References

External links
 Guillermo Cubillos at Football-Lineups
 
 

1995 births
Living people
Chilean footballers
Chilean Primera División players
O'Higgins F.C. footballers
Deportes Colchagua footballers
Association football fullbacks
People from Rancagua